The Olympus PEN E-PL5, announced on September 17, 2012 is Olympus Corporation's tenth camera that adheres to the Micro Four Thirds (MFT) system design standard. The E-PL5 succeeds the Olympus PEN E-PL3, and was announced in concert with one other model, the Olympus PEN E-PM2 (a simpler version of the PEN E-PL5 and the successor to the E-PM1).

Technology

The E-PL5, together with the E-PM2, features a touchscreen, similar to the Olympus PEN E-P3 and Olympus OM-D E-M5, and the same 16.1 megapixel sensor as is in the OM-D E-M5, with its increased ISO range, low-light capability and wide dynamic range. Although the Olympus E-PL5 uses the same sensor as the OM-D E-M5, it lacks the 5 axis stabilisation system of the latter such as OM-D and E-P5, utilising a simpler system 2 axis stabilisation that only compensates for yaw and pitch.

The E-PL5 increases autofocus speed through use of a 240 Hz refresh rate for its sensor, similar to the technology used in its flagship MFT camera, the OM-D E-M5. The benefits of the 240 Hz refresh rate also provides the ability for continuous autofocus tracking during bursts of exposures, a faster shutter response (less lag) and less blackout time between exposures.

The E-PL5 has a capacitive touchscreen similar to E-P3 and OM-D E-M5 for creative camera control, but lacks an OLED type display that is supposed to vastly improve performance in sunny conditions, and off-angle viewing. Instead, the E-PL5 has a tiltable LCD, which allows easy above the head, waist level, low off the ground viewing and self-portraits, but no viewfinder. With no built-in flash, but sold with clip-on flash, the E-PL5 continues with the proprietary Accessory Port, a power and communication port, which allows the use of various accessories, such as other external flash, an external stereo microphone for HD video recording, LED macro lights, and a bluetooth communications adapter. The accessory port is compatible with the optional hotshoe mounted VF-2, VF-3 and VF-4 electronic viewfinders (EVF).

Differences over Olympus PEN E-PL3
 16.1 megapixel sensor instead of 12.3 megapixel
 Option to reduce the size of the focus points
 For the first time, Olympus gives priority over its own in-body system to lens-based image stabilisation when Panasonic lenses with this feature are mounted 
 170 degree "flip-up" capacitative touchscreen
 Detachable grip
 New "Water Colour" Art Filter in addition to the 11 existing Art Filters of the E-PL3.

Specifications not in the infobox
 1080 Full HD video at 30p frames per second

See also
 Olympus PEN E-PL3
 Olympus OM-D E-M5

References

External links

Olympus PEN E-PL5 Product Site
Dpreview.com: Olympus PEN E-PL3 and PEN E-PM1 Preview
Photographyblog.com: Olympus PEN E-PL5 Review
Ming Thein: The Olympus E-PL5 PEN Lite review: a mini-OM-D

PEN E-PL5
Live-preview digital cameras
Cameras introduced in 2012